Stephen III (1337 – 26 September 1413), called the Magnificent or the Fop (Stephan der Kneißl), was the Duke of Bavaria-Ingolstadt from 1375. He was the eldest son of Stephen II and Elizabeth of Sicily.

Family
His maternal grandparents were Frederick III of Sicily and Eleanor of Anjou, the daughter of Charles II of Naples and Maria Arpad of Hungary. Maria was a daughter of Stephen V of Hungary and his wife, queen Elisabeth, who was daughter of Zayhan of Kuni, a chief of the Cuman tribe and had been a pagan before her marriage.

Stephen V was a son of Béla IV of Hungary and Maria Laskarina. Maria Laskarina was a daughter of Theodore I Lascaris and Anna Angelina. Anna was daughter of Eastern Roman Emperor Alexius III and Euphrosyne Doukaina Kamaterina.

Reign
From 1375 to 1392, Stephen ruled Bavaria with his brothers Frederick and John II.  However, in 1392, Bavaria was split into three separate Duchies, now consisting of Bavaria-Landshut, Bavaria-Ingolstadt and Bavaria-Munich.  John II partitioned Bavaria as the result of his refusal to finance his brothers' expensive ambitions in the Italian court.  After the division of Bavaria, Stephen retained Bavaria-Ingolstadt, although he soon came to regard his share to be inferior to the other two Duchies. From 1395 to 1397, he also jointly held Bavaria-Munich with John II, after an armed conflict between the brothers.

After the deaths of both of his brothers, Stephen attempted to extend his Duchy, this time causing conflict with his nephews. In opposition to them, Stephen also supported King Rupert against the Luxemburg.  In 1402 Stephen was forced by his nephew Ernest to confine his reign to Bavaria-Ingolstadt.  In 1403, he supported the citizens' uprising in Munich, although that failed. His final attempt in 1410 to reconquer Tyrol, which his father had ceded to the Grand Duchy of Habsburg was likewise unsuccessful.

He died at Niederschönenfeld.

Family and children
He was married twice. First, he was married on 13 October 1364 to Taddea Visconti, daughter of Bernabò Visconti and Beatrice della Scala. He had, from his first marriage:
 Louis VII the Bearded, who succeeded him in Bavaria-Ingolstadt,
 Isabeau of Bavaria, married Charles VI, king of France.

Second, he was married in Cologne on 16 January 1401 to Elisabeth of Cleves, daughter of Count Adolf III of Cleves.

Ancestors

References

Sources

[aged 76]

1337 births
1413 deaths
14th-century dukes of Bavaria
15th-century dukes of Bavaria
House of Wittelsbach